Clerical High School of Saint Arsenije ( / Bogoslovija Sveti Arsenije Sremac), is the oldest Serbian seminary, a clerical Grande école. It is a college following the French academic standards of the Grande école, hence Higher School or Visoka škola, on par with university. The university is located at Sremski Karlovci.

It was founded in 1794, three years after the Gymnasium of Karlovci by Metropolitan Stefan Stratimirović.

This school represents one of the oldest and most important educational institutions for Serbs.

The second half of the 19th century represents the golden age in the history of this school, when Ilarion Ruvarac became the rector, and Baron Jovan Živković was one of the professors. In that period one of the first departments for bee keeping was established in the school. The Clerical school was closed in 1914, after the World War I reestablished in Belgrade.

The modern Clerical school called "Saint Arsenije Sremac" was founded in 1964, in a building called  ( or ), built at the beginning of the 20th century by Patriarch Georgije Branković, located in the old city core.

See also

Buildings and structures in Sremski Karlovci

References
Provided by Tourist information of Sremski Karlovci

Literature
 

Educational institutions of the Serbian Orthodox Church
Buildings and structures in Sremski Karlovci
Sremski Karlovci
Education in Serbia
Educational organizations based in Serbia
Serbian Orthodox clergy
Palaces in Serbia